Tony Johns (born August 1, 1960) is a former Canadian football running back who played four seasons in the Canadian Football League with the Montreal Concordes/Alouettes, Toronto Argonauts and Winnipeg Blue Bombers. He played college football at Henderson State University.

References

External links
Just Sports Stats

Living people
1960 births
Canadian football running backs
American football running backs
Jamaican players of Canadian football
Jamaican players of American football
Canadian players of American football
Henderson State Reddies football players
Montreal Concordes players
Montreal Alouettes players
Toronto Argonauts players
Winnipeg Blue Bombers players
Sportspeople from Kingston, Jamaica